Vontae Jason Daley-Campbell (born 2 April 2001) is an English professional footballer who plays as right-back for  club Cardiff City.

Club career

Leicester City
Daley-Campbell joined Leicester after being released by Arsenal in 2019. He made his professional debut on 10 February 2021, playing the entirety of a 1–0 win against Brighton in the FA Cup fifth round.

Dundee (loan)
On 31 January 2022, Daley-Campbell signed for Scottish Premiership side Dundee on loan until the end of the season. He would make his debut the next day, starting in the Dundee derby. Daley-Campbell would return to his parent club at the end of the season in May 2022.

Cardiff City
On 15 June 2022, Daley-Campbell agreed to join Championship side Cardiff City on a three-year deal, active from 1 July when his Leicester City contract expires.

International career
Daley-Campbell was a member of the England under-17 team that hosted the 2018 UEFA European Under-17 Championship.

Career statistics

Honours
Leicester City
FA Cup: 2020–21

References

2001 births
Living people
Black British sportspeople
Footballers from the London Borough of Lambeth
English footballers
Association football defenders
Leicester City F.C. players
Dundee F.C. players
Cardiff City F.C. players
Scottish Professional Football League players
England youth international footballers